An election was held on November 4, 2014 to elect all 41 members to Delaware's House of Representatives. The election coincided with the elections for other offices, including U.S. Senate, U.S. House of Representatives and state senate. The primary election was held on September 9, 2014.

Democrats retained control of the House despite losing two seats, winning 25 seats compared to 16 seats for the Republicans.

Results

Statewide

District
Results of the 2014 Delaware House of Representatives election by district:

References

House of Representatives
Delaware House of Representatives
2014